Plan of a Novel, according to Hints from Various Quarters is a short satirical work by Jane Austen, probably written in May 1816. It was published in complete form for the first time by R. W. Chapman in 1926, extracts having appeared in 1871. It has been said that "in the Plan and the correspondence from which it arose, we have the most important account of what Jane Austen understood to be her aims and capacities as a novelist".

Background
In 1815 Austen met the Rev. James Stanier Clarke in London. He had ideas for her fiction, including a novel to be based on a clergyman with a foothold in urban life, as well as the provincial rural settings she had used so far for clerics in her novels. At the time (October 1815) she was staying with her brother in London negotiating the publication of Emma, which was then dedicated to the Prince Regent through the good offices of Clarke, who was the Prince's librarian. Among Clarke's suggestions was a historical novel on the House of Coburg: Austen side-stepped with a disclaimer about her talents.  Clarke recommended that Austen should dedicate Emma to the Prince Regent.  She did this, although she disapproved of his attitude towards his wife.

Content and humour of the Plan
The intention of the work was to set down the essential parts of the "ideal novel". Austen was following, and guying, the recommendations of Clarke. The work was also influenced by some of Austen's personal circle with views on the novel of courtship, and names are recorded in the margins of the manuscript; they included William Gifford, her publisher, and her niece Fanny Knight.

The Plan became a sort of family joke among the Austens. Some of its aspects parody contemporary works by authors such as Sophie Cottin, Fanny Burney, Anna Maria Porter, and Mary Brunton. The satire of the Plan was analysed by Austen's nephew James Edward Austen-Leigh, in his biography A Memoir of Jane Austen (1869, expanded edition 1871).

References

Notes

Books published posthumously
Juvenilia and other works by Jane Austen